The Massif de l'Étoile (Occitan: Montanha de l'Estela, French: massif de l'Étoile, i.e. "Star Mountain", "Star Massif") is a little mountain range located north of Marseilles, in Occitania and in France. Its area is approximately 100 km² and its highest point stands at 779 m.

Landforms of Bouches-du-Rhône
Mountain ranges of Provence-Alpes-Côte d'Azur
Provence-Alpes-Côte d'Azur region articles needing translation from French Wikipedia